Nashorn, Zebra & Co. is a German television series.

See also
List of German television series

External links
 

2007 German television series debuts
2010s German television series
Television series about mammals
Television shows set in Munich
German-language television shows
Das Erste original programming